Sferkë )) is a village in the Klina municipality, Kosovo.

Notes

References

Villages in Klina